The men's giant slalom competition at the 2003 Asian Winter Games in Aomori, Japan was held on 3 February at the Ajigasawa Ski Area.

Schedule
All times are Japan Standard Time (UTC+09:00)

Results

References 

1st run
2nd run

External links
Results at FIS website

Giant Slalom